Election to the 7th convocation of the Moscow City Duma took place on the United Voting Day on 8 September 2019. The elections were held under first-past-the-post voting system, which saw 45 deputies being elected in their respective single-member districts in amidst of the 2019 Moscow protests which saw huge rallies in support of independent opposition candidates. The term of the new Duma will be five years.

Background and preparations

The Moscow City Election Commission organizes 3,616 polling stations, of which 3,440 - at the places of residence, 176 - at places of temporary residence (hospitals, sanatoriums, places of temporary detention of suspects and accused, and other places of temporary stay).

Candidates for registration must collect voter signatures in their support in the amount of 3% of all constituency voters (from 4,500 to 5,500 signatures). However, regardless of whether a candidate has enough valid signatures, a candidate will not be on the ballot if more than 10% of the signatures are considered flawed by the Moscow City Election Commission (MCEC).

Candidates nominated by political parties represented in the State Duma (United Russia, CPRF, LDPR, A Just Russia) could nominate their candidates without collecting signatures. However, United Russia did not formally nominate any persons, instead in an attempt to gain election support from low information voters, the party endorsed several self-nominee (independent) candidates due to United Russia's unpopularity amongst the Moscow electorate. In an attempt to potentially prevent a number of independent candidates (affiliated with the United Russia) to be elected for the Moscow City Duma, opposition politician Alexey Navalny launched the “Smart Voting” project, which urged Russian citizens to strategically vote towards any presumably strongest candidates who were not supporters of the United Russia.

On 26 July 2019, the "Liberal Mission" Foundation published a report entitled “Results of the nomination and registration at the elections of deputies of the Moscow City Duma on 8 September 2019”. According to the authors of the report Alexander Kenev, Arkady Lyubarev and Andrey Maximov, the results of registration of candidates for the MCD indicate electoral commission's inadequacy and injustice, suggesting that there was an unequal approach and even discrimination in the process of registering candidates.

Constituencies 

The current constituencies' boundaries were adopted on 30 April 2014. According to independent experts, they contain marks of gerrymandering.

The list of constituencies and candidates. In central, southwestern and northwestern constituencies the independent opposition candidates had strong chances (see also 2013 Moscow mayoral election, districts where Navalny had good results), in most of other constituencies the strongest opponent is a CPRF candidate. However, some strong candidates, even nominated by political parties represented in the State Duma, were excluded from the race. In constituency 43 no pro-United Russia candidates are registered.

Rejection of opposition candidacies 

After the verification of the signatures collected by the candidates, the Moscow City Election Commission (MCEC) refused to register most of independent opposition candidates. The claimed reason was the high percentage of rejected signatures (exceeding permissible reject rate is 10%). Independent candidates accused the MCEC of forgery in verifying signatures aimed at prohibiting the opposition to participate in elections. During the verification some personal data of the signers was entered with errors. In addition, a significant part of the signatures was invalidated on the grounds of a so-called handwriting examination, which scientific validity and impartiality the candidates questioned. The candidates submitted to the MCEC statements confirming the validity of signatures from signatories, whose signatures were rejected on the grounds of handwriting examination. The candidates also submitted to the MCEC an opinion of professional handwriting experts on the insolvency of the MCEC examination. Despite this, the MCEC did not change the decision. In protest, one of the candidates, Lyubov Sobol, went on a hunger strike on July 13.

On the other hand, the MCEC registered 32 candidates from Communists of Russia party, which has very low popularity (during 2016 election to the State Duma it collected 2%). This party is regarded by experts as a spoiler for CPRF. These candidates are almost unknown in Moscow, mostly students, housewives and low-skilled workers. According to the MCEC, these 32 unknown candidates managed to collect the necessary signatures. However, Muscovites did not see any signature collectors for the candidates from Communists of Russia or pro-United Russia 'independent' candidates in the streets of their city.  Later, an opposition newspaper Novaya Gazeta revealed that the same headquarters coordinates the actions of candidates from Communists of Russia and pro-United Russia 'independents'.

Starting from July 2019, numerous approved and unapproved rallies in Moscow took place. Rallies on Sakharov Avenue on July 20 and August 10, 2019, became the largest political rallies in Russia after the 2011–2013 protests and the rally on 27 July 27 established a record high for the number of detainees. The protests were accompanied by massive administrative arrests of unregistered independent candidates and two criminal cases: the obstructing the work of election commissions case and the riots case (also known as the Moscow case).

Campaign

Pro-United Russia candidates 
Positive articles about pro-United Russia candidates began to appear in district newspapers six months before the official start of the race, thus allowing to identify them. Pro-United Russia candidates received 800 mln rubles (~12.5 mln USD) from funds affiliated with United Russia for their campaigns. All other candidates had significantly less resources. Pro-United Russia candidates actively used outdoor advertising and promoted in various media.

Shortly before election day, fake "smart vote" (see below) posters with wrong candidate began to appear. For example, posters were actively distributed in constituency 15, stating that "Navalny supports candidate Ostrikov from the Communists of Russia party", while "smart vote" supported the candidate from the CPRF Savostianov. Also, in some constituencies, Communist of Russia party candidates from Russia became more active, though they show no activity during most of the campaign. Their posters and agitation cubes were made as similar as possible to the posters and agitation cubes of candidates from the CPRF.

Non-system opposition 
Non-system opposition figures divided in their opinion on participation in the elections.

Alexei Navalny offered a "smart vote" tactic, which boils down to voting for the most popular candidate among the parliamentary opposition or the independents, in order to prevent a United Russia domination. They marked with a (*) in the list below. The FBK has issued many anti-corruption investigations in support of the "smart vote".

Mikhail Khodorkovsky made a site with candidates' opinion on detainees during 2019 Moscow protests. His site was heavily criticised due to mentioning Valeria Kasamara among the supporters of the detainees, what was seen as a hypocrisy given her support by the United Russia and Sobyanin.

Dmitry Gudkov made a short list of worthy candidates. They marked with a (¤) below.

Garry Kasparov called to boycott the elections.

FBK Investigations 

During the 2019 Moscow City Duma elections campaign the FBK published a lot of anti-corruption investigations against Moscow City Duma deputies from the United Russia faction, the CEC and the MCEC members and Moscow City officials. Even authorities later admitted that FBK investigations had a significant impact on protest activity and election results.

On July 1, the FBK published an investigation of Andrey Metelsky's, the leader of the United Russia faction in the Moscow City Duma, property. He has been a deputy in the Moscow City Duma since 2001. His son and 75 years old mother owns hotels Maximilian (bought for 5.36 mln €), Tirolerhof (3.6 mln €), Mozart (7 mln €), Strudlhof (24 mln €) in Austria, multi-apartment complex "Lefort", built near the MosMetro station under construction Lefortovo, auto center network "Obukhov", 2 "Tanuki" restaurants, hotel "Foresta" and 4 apartments with a total area of 1700 m2 in Moscow, 3 houses in Moscow Oblast and 1 house in Kaliningrad Oblast. The total cost of his real estate in Moscow only is about 5.7 billion rubles (~ US$90 mln).

On July 18, the FBK published an investigations of the head of the MCEC Valentin Gorbunov's property. His family owns two apartments with a total area of 200 m2 worth US$420 000 in Ika, Croatia.

On July 22, the FBK revealed that pro-government journalist Vladimir Solovyov has an Italian permanent residency.

On August 1, the FBK published an investigation of the vice-mayor Natalya Sergunina's property. Sergunina is responsible for the election process in Moscow. The FBK estimates Sergunina's (along with close relatives) undeclared real estate value at 6.5 billion rub (~ US$100 mln).

On August 12, the FBK published an investigation of the member of the CEC Boris Ebzeev's property. His grandson at the age of 4 bought an apartment worth 500 mln rub (~ US$18.5 mln), and at the age of 7 a house in Moscow Oblast.

On August 12, it was revealed that the MCEC member Dmitry Reut bought an apartment worth 22 mln rub (~US$0.8 mln) from the city of Moscow on unknown conditions. The cost of the apartment exceeds his income for previous years by 2 times.

On August 15, the FBK published an investigation of Alexei Shaposhnikov's, the chairman of the Moscow City Duma, property. He owns an apartment in the center of Moscow with a total area of 270 m2 worth 95 mln rub (~US$1.5 mln).

On August 20, the FBK published an investigation of Ilya Platonov's, the son of the former chairman of the Moscow City Duma Vladimir Platonov, property. He owns an apartment in the center of Moscow, on the "golden mile", with a total area of 372 m2 worth 600 mln rub (~US$9.4 mln) and a house in Moscow Oblast with total area of 4000 m2 worth 4000 mln rub (~US$62.5 mln). The Moscow "Golden mile" is an extremely expensive part of Moscow between Ostozhenka street and Prechistenskaya embarkment, where the price of an apartment start from US$25 000 per m2.

On August 22, the FBK published an investigation of Vladimir Regnatsky's, the head of Security and Anti-Corruption Department of Moscow City, property. Regnatsky is one of those officials who "approves" rallies and is responsible for their dispersing. His mother owns an apartment in the center of Moscow, on the "golden mile", with total area of 146 m2 worth 200 mln rub (~US$3.1 mln).

On August 26, the FBK published an investigation of the vice-mayor Alexander Gorbenko's property. Along with his son and wife he owns a land plot with total area of 20 000 m2 in Moscow Oblast, where 9 houses built, worth 500 mln rub (~US$7.8 mln).

On August 27, the FBK published an investigation of Alexander Gorbenko's children's property. His son owns an apartment in the center of Moscow with total area of 226 m2 worth 300 mln rub (~US$4.7 mln), and his daughter owns an apartment in the center of Moscow with total area of 174 m2 worth 240 mln rub (~US$3.8 mln).

On August 29, the FBK published second investigation of Andrey Metelsky's property. He owns and manages a motorcycle shop "Alpine", while the Russian legislation prohibits deputies from doing business.

On August 30, the FBK published an investigation of the vice-chairman of the CEC Nikolay Bulaev's property. Along with his daughter he owns 3 apartments in Moscow with total area of 392 m2 worth 220 mln rub (~US$3.4 mln).

On September 2, the FBK published an investigation of the deputy of the Moscow City Duma Lyudmila Stebenkova's property. She owns an apartment in the center of Moscow with total area of 197 m2 worth 80 mln rub (~US$1.25 mln) and owned 1 more apartment with total area of 178 m2 which she sold in 2005.

On September 3, the FBK published an investigation of the deputy of the Moscow City Duma Stepan Orlov's property. He received from the City of Moscow two apartments in the center of Moscow with total area of 246 m2 in exchange of his old apartment with total area of 58 m2.

On September 4, the FBK published an investigation of the deputy of the Moscow City Duma Kirill Shchitov's property. He owns an apartment in center of Moscow, on the "golden mile", with total area of 180 m2 and one more with total area of 122 m2, and also two luxury cars.

On September 5, the FBK published an investigation of the vice-mayor Pyotr Biryukov's property. Along with his family he owns 17 apartments in the center of Moscow, 22 luxury cars and a farm estate in Moscow Oblast total worth of 5.5 bln rub (~US$86 mln).

On September 6, the FBK published second investigation of the vice-mayor Natalya Sergunina's property. Her daughter's husband, Aaron-Elizer Aronov, owns the "Aviapark" mall worth of 4.3 bln rub (~US$67.2 mln). Besides, the building company, belonging to Aronov, did not fulfill its social obligations to build a school and museum nearby.

Government response to investigations 

The government responded to these investigations with criminal prosecution and mass raids on the FBK offices.

Results

The results show the success of the "smart voting" strategy: none of the United Russia candidates had 50+% (in 2014 there were 16 such candidates), and only one had 45+% support. All 6 close cases, when the difference between two leading candidates was less than 600 votes, resulted in United Russia's candidate victory (constituencies 7, 9, 30, 32, 34, 36).

However, political analysts Ivan Bolshakov and Vladimir Perevalov suggest that a high assessment of this strategy is emotional rather than scientific. They conclude that the success of the opposition can be explained by the combination of two factors: the increase in protest sentiments, which reduced the electoral base of the pro-government nominees, and the decrease in the level of competition inside the opposition, due to both the “smart voting” strategy and disqualification of candidates. These factors ensured the flow of votes away from the administrative candidates and weak opposition members to the most powerful opposition candidates. “Smart voting” contributed to this victory, but did not determine the overall outcome of the elections. Its quantitative effect amounted to 5.6% of the vote. Moreover, while “smart voting” played a decisive role in the victory of several candidates, it deprived of victory approximately the same number of opposition representatives.

Constituencies 12, 16, 24 among other candidates contained spoilers to opposition candidates with the same surnames (and even name in const. 16). In constituency 10 the surname of the candidate from Communists of Russia party is also similar to the surname of the candidate from CPRF.

By 22:30 September 9 the data input of the results was halted, and renewed only in the early morning, around 3-4 a.m. of September 10. In the constituency 15, where the leader of the United Russia's faction Andrey Metelsky tried to re-elect, the input renewed only around 5:30 a.m.

The leader of the Moscow branch of CPRF Valery Rashkin stated that in constituencies 7, 25, 32, 36 victories of United Russia's candidates were caused by few (or even one) polling stations with an abnormally high percent of votes for the United Russia's candidate. For example, polling station 1753, constituency 32 (Likhachev - 171, Melnikova - 930). He also doubted the integrity of the electronic voting, which was practised in constituencies 1, 10 and 30, and resulted in an abnormally high percentage of votes for the United Russia's candidate.

The results for constituency 30 are suspicious not only due to electronic voting results, but also due to results in the neuropsychiatric dispensary (polling station 2047: Rusetskaya - 122, Yuneman - 6, Zhukovsky - 23), given that the final lead of Rusetskaya over Yuneman is only 84 votes. Electronic voting (polling stations 5001, 5002 and 5003) results provided separately below.

Navalny stated that in constituencies 25, 32, 36 (all abnormally high percent for United Russia candidate in few polling stations), 1, 30 (both electronic voting) the victory of the non-United Russia candidate was stolen.

Even given these facts, the opposition received the largest number of seats in Moscow City Duma since 1990s. The "smart vote" candidates collected 586,286 votes altogether, while Pro-United Russia candidates collected 555,063 votes.

31 self-promoted candidates from Communists of Russia party collected only 79062 votes altogether, though they had submitted around 160 000 signatures from voters to participate in elections.

By constituency

District 1

District 2

See also

2019 Moscow protests
2019 Russian elections ("United Voting Day")
By-elections to the 7th Moscow City Duma
Opposition to Vladimir Putin in Russia
2013 Moscow mayoral election
FBK

References

2019 elections in Russia
2019 in Moscow
Legislative elections in Moscow
September 2019 events in Russia
Political controversies in Russia